Tiger horses are gaited, spotted horses with a coat color much like the Appaloosa. The tiger horse can exhibit various ambling gaits including various lateral gaits called the "glider gait" or Indian shuffle, stepping pace, and running walk, as well as the diagonal fox trot. Registered horses must exhibit gaits without artificial aids and while flat-shod.

There are two types of tiger horse, the "Heavenly Type" and the "Royalty Type". Because the tiger horse breed is still in development, there are variations in conformation even within these two types. The tiger horse may have a straight or convex profile. Breeders are striving for the predominance of the convex profile as it reflects the Spanish ancestry of the breed. According to the Tiger Horse Association, "breeders are advised to use only the exceptional Gliders in future breeding experiments, and only with Royalty horses." As of 2011, Heavenly types exhibiting glider gaits will only be registered if one parent is a registered Royalty type.

See also 
 Walkaloosa

References

Horse breeds
Horse breeds originating in the United States